Captive Hearts or Captive Heart may refer to:

 The Captive Heart, a 1946 war film starring Michael Redgrave
 Captive Hearts (manga), by Matsuri Hino
 Captive Hearts (film), a 1987 romantic film
 Captive Hearts (X-Men), the fifth episode from 'X-Men: The Animated Series''
 "Captive Heart" (song), a 1996 song by Selena